Political entities in the 17th century BC – Political entities in the 15th century BC – Political entities by century

This is a list of political entities in the 16th century BC (1600–1501 BC).

Sovereign states

See also
List of Bronze Age states
List of Classical Age states
List of Iron Age states
List of states during Antiquity
List of state leaders in the 16th century BC

References
 

-16
16th century BC-related lists